This is a list of rectors of the University of Copenhagen.

List of rectors

References 

!